Semyon Bilmes  (29 August 1955) is an Azerbaijani American painter and the founder and instructor of The Ashland Academy of Art, in Ashland, Oregon, United States and Atelier Maui, in Maui, Hawaii United States.

Bilmes has achieved national recognition as an advertising, editorial, and book illustrator. Bilmes has illustrated campaigns for AT&T, CBS, General Mills, Warner Lambert, Smirnoff Vodka, Citibank, Clairol, Western Union, Alaska Airlines, and Philip Morris. His work can be found on the covers of books and periodicals such as Reader's Digest and the New York Times. His oil painting, "Lady in a red Turban", was on the cover of the annual directory of top illustrators and designers in the country, American Showcase.

Life
Semyon Bilmes was born August 29, 1955, in Baku, Azerbaijan SSR.  His art education started when he was a child in youth classes where he studied fundamentals of drawing. When he reached the age of sixteen he attended the A. Azim-Zade Academy of Art in Baku (USSR) where he was trained in the Russian Academic System. Bilmes' emigrated to New York in 1980 where he also graduated from the Parsons School of Design.

As a successful artist, Bilmes founded the Bilmes Art School, where for ten years he taught art with a commercial emphasis.

Blimes later acquired and renovated a large building in Ashland, Oregon, for The Ashland Academy of Art. In 2010, Semyon with his family moved to Maui where they opened Atelier Maui. Semyon is currently teaching at Atelier Maui. .

Bilmes lives on Maui with his wife and one of his four children.

See also 
 Atelier Method

References 

1955 births
20th-century American painters
American male painters
21st-century American painters
Azerbaijani painters
Soviet emigrants to the United States
Living people
Artists from Baku
American people of Azerbaijani descent
People from Ashland, Oregon
20th-century American male artists